Electoral district of Sturt may refer to:

 Electoral district of Sturt (New South Wales), a former electorate of the New South Wales Legislative Assembly
 Electoral district of Sturt (South Australia), a former electorate of the South Australian House of Assembly

See also
 Division of Sturt, federal electorate in South Australia
 Electoral district of Stuart, state electorate South Australia